β-Hydroxy β-methylbutyric acid (HMB), otherwise known as its conjugate base, is a naturally produced substance in humans that is used as a dietary supplement and as an ingredient in certain medical foods that are intended to promote wound healing and provide nutritional support for people with muscle wasting due to cancer or HIV/AIDS. In healthy adults, supplementation with HMB has been shown to increase exercise-induced gains in muscle size, muscle strength, and lean body mass, reduce skeletal muscle damage from exercise, improve aerobic exercise performance, and expedite recovery from exercise. Medical reviews and meta-analyses indicate that HMB supplementation also helps to preserve or increase lean body mass and muscle strength in individuals experiencing age-related muscle loss. HMB produces these effects in part by stimulating the production of proteins and inhibiting the breakdown of proteins in muscle tissue. No adverse effects from long-term use as a dietary supplement in adults have been found.

HMB is also contained in several nutritional products, including certain formulations of Ensure, Juven, and Myoplex. HMB is also present in insignificant quantities in certain foods, such as alfalfa, asparagus, avocados, cauliflower, grapefruit, and catfish.

HMB has not been banned by the National Collegiate Athletic Association, World Anti-Doping Agency, or any other prominent national or international athletic organization. In 2006, only about 2% of college student athletes in the United States used HMB as a dietary supplement. As of 2017, HMB has found widespread use as an ergogenic supplement among young athletes.

Uses

Available forms

HMB is sold as an over-the-counter dietary supplement in the free acid form, β-hydroxy β-methylbutyric acid (HMB-FA), and as a monohydrated calcium salt of the conjugate base, calcium  monohydrate (HMB-Ca, CaHMB). Since only a small fraction of HMB's metabolic precursor, is metabolized into HMB, pharmacologically active concentrations of the compound in blood plasma and muscle can only be achieved by supplementing HMB directly. A healthy adult produces approximately 0.3 grams per day, while supplemental HMB is usually taken in doses of  grams per day. HMB is also contained in several nutritional products and medical foods marketed by Abbott Laboratories (e.g., certain formulations of Ensure, Juven, and Myoplex), and is present in insignificant quantities in certain foods, such as alfalfa, asparagus, avocados, cauliflower, grapefruit, and catfish.

Medical

Supplemental HMB has been used in clinical trials as a treatment for preserving lean body mass in muscle wasting conditions, particularly sarcopenia, and has been studied in clinical trials as an adjunct therapy in conjunction with resistance exercise. Based upon two medical reviews and a meta-analysis of seven randomized controlled trials, HMB supplementation can preserve or increase lean muscle mass and muscle strength in sarcopenic older adults. HMB does not appear to significantly affect fat mass in older adults. Preliminary clinical evidence suggests that HMB supplementation may also prevent muscle atrophy during bed rest. A growing body of evidence supports the efficacy of HMB in nutritional support for reducing, or even reversing, the loss of muscle mass, muscle function, and muscle strength that occurs in hypercatabolic disease states such as cancer cachexia; consequently, the authors of two 2016 reviews of the clinical evidence recommended that the prevention and treatment of sarcopenia and muscle wasting in general include supplementation with HMB, regular resistance exercise, and consumption of a high-protein diet.

Clinical trials that used HMB for the treatment of muscle wasting have involved the administration of 3 grams of HMB per day under different dosing regimens. According to one review, an optimal dosing regimen is to administer it in one 1 gram dose, three times a day, since this ensures elevated plasma concentrations of HMB throughout the day; however,  the best dosing regimen for muscle wasting conditions is still being investigated.

Some branded products that contain HMB (i.e., certain formulations of Ensure and Juven) are medical foods that are intended to be used to provide nutritional support under the care of a doctor in individuals with muscle wasting due to HIV/AIDS or cancer, to promote wound healing following surgery or injury, or when otherwise recommended by a medical professional. Further research involving the treatment of cancer cachexia with Juven over a period of several months is required to adequately determine treatment efficacy.

Enhancing performance

With an appropriate exercise program, dietary supplementation with 3 grams of HMB per day has been shown to increase exercise-induced gains in muscle size, muscle strength and power, and lean body mass, reduce exercise-induced skeletal muscle damage, and expedite recovery from high-intensity exercise. Based upon limited clinical research, HMB supplementation may also improve aerobic exercise performance and increase gains in aerobic fitness when combined with high-intensity interval training. These effects of HMB are more pronounced in untrained individuals and athletes who perform high intensity resistance or aerobic exercise. In resistance-trained populations, the effects of HMB on muscle strength and lean body mass are limited. HMB affects muscle size, strength, mass, power, and recovery in part by stimulating myofibrillar muscle protein synthesis and inhibiting muscle protein breakdown through various mechanisms, including the activation of mechanistic target of rapamycin complex 1 (mTORC1) and inhibition of proteasome-mediated proteolysis in skeletal muscles.

The efficacy of HMB supplementation for reducing skeletal muscle damage from prolonged or high-intensity exercise is affected by the time that it is used relative to exercise.

In 2006, only about 2% of college student athletes in the United States used HMB as a dietary supplement. As of 2017, HMB has found widespread use as an ergogenic supplement among athletes.  HMB has not been banned by the National Collegiate Athletic Association, World Anti-Doping Agency, or any other prominent national or international athletic organization.

Side effects

The safety profile of HMB in adult humans is based upon evidence from clinical trials in humans and animal studies. In humans, no adverse effects in young adults or older adults have been reported when HMB is taken in doses of 3 grams per day for up to a year. Studies on young adults taking 6 grams of HMB per day for up to 2 months have also reported no adverse effects. Studies with supplemental HMB on young, growing rats and livestock have reported no adverse effects based upon clinical chemistry or observable characteristics; for humans younger than 18, there is limited data on the safety of supplemental HMB. The human equivalent dose of HMB for the no-observed-adverse-effect level (NOAEL) that was identified in a rat model is approximately 0.4 g/kg of body weight per day.

Two animal studies have examined the effects of HMB supplementation in pregnant pigs on the offspring and reported no adverse effects on the fetus. No clinical testing with supplemental HMB has been conducted on pregnant women, and pregnant and lactating women are advised not to take HMB by Metabolic Technologies, Inc., the company that grants licenses to include HMB in dietary supplements, due to a lack of safety studies.

Pharmacology

Pharmacodynamics

Several components of the signaling cascade that mediates the HMB-induced increase in human skeletal muscle protein synthesis have been identified in vivo. Supplementation with HMB in several non-human animal species has been shown to increase the serum concentration of growth hormone and insulin-like growth factor 1 (IGF-1) via an unknown mechanism, in turn promoting protein synthesis through increased mTOR phosphorylation. Based upon limited clinical evidence in humans, supplemental HMB appears to increase the secretion of growth hormone and IGF-1 in response to resistance exercise.

, the signaling cascade that mediates the HMB-induced reduction in muscle protein breakdown has not been identified in living humans, although it is well-established that it attenuates proteolysis in humans in vivo. Unlike , HMB attenuates muscle protein breakdown in an insulin-independent manner in humans. HMB is believed to reduce muscle protein breakdown in humans by inhibiting the 19S and 20S subunits of the ubiquitin–proteasome system in skeletal muscle and by inhibiting apoptosis of skeletal muscle nuclei via unidentified mechanisms.

Based upon animal studies, HMB appears to be metabolized within skeletal muscle into cholesterol, which may then be incorporated into the muscle cell membrane, thereby enhancing membrane integrity and function. The effects of HMB on muscle protein metabolism may help stabilize muscle cell structure. One review suggested that the observed HMB-induced reduction in the plasma concentration of muscle damage biomarkers (i.e., muscle enzymes such as creatine kinase and lactate dehydrogenase) in humans following intense exercise may be due to a cholesterol-mediated improvement in muscle cell membrane function.

HMB has been shown to stimulate the proliferation, differentiation, and fusion of human myosatellite cells in vitro, which potentially increases the regenerative capacity of skeletal muscle, by increasing the protein expression of certain myogenic regulatory factors (e.g., myoD and myogenin) and gene transcription factors (e.g., MEF2). HMB-induced human myosatellite cell proliferation in vitro is mediated through the phosphorylation of the mitogen-activated protein kinases ERK1 and ERK2. HMB-induced human myosatellite differentiation and accelerated fusion of myosatellite cells into muscle tissue in vitro is mediated through the phosphorylation of Akt, a serine/threonine-specific protein kinase.

Pharmacokinetics

The free acid and monohydrated calcium salt forms of HMB have different pharmacokinetics. HMB-FA is more readily absorbed into the bloodstream and has a longer elimination half-life (3 hours) relative to HMB-Ca (2.5 hours). Tissue uptake and utilization of HMB-FA is  higher than for HMB-Ca. The fraction of an ingested dose that is excreted in urine does not differ between the two forms.

After ingestion,  is converted to  following dissociation of the calcium moiety in the gut. When the HMB-Ca dosage form is ingested, the magnitude and time at which the peak plasma concentration of HMB occurs depends on the dose and concurrent food intake. Higher HMB-Ca doses increase the rate of absorption, resulting in a peak plasma HMB level (Cmax) that is disproportionately greater than expected of a linear dose-response relationship and which occurs sooner relative to lower doses. Consumption of HMB-Ca with sugary substances slows the rate of HMB absorption, resulting in a lower peak plasma HMB level that occurs later.

The remaining  of the dose is retained in tissues or excreted as HMB metabolites. The fraction of a given dose of HMB that is excreted unchanged in urine increases with the dose.

Metabolism

Biosynthesis

The vast majority of  metabolism is initially catalyzed by the branched-chain amino acid aminotransferase enzyme, producing  (α-KIC). α-KIC is mostly metabolized by the mitochondrial enzyme branched-chain  dehydrogenase, which converts it to isovaleryl-CoA. During biotin deficiency, HMB can be synthesized from  via enoyl-CoA hydratase and an unknown thioesterase enzyme, which convert  into  and  into HMB respectively. A relatively small amount of α-KIC is metabolized in the liver by the cytosolic enzyme 4-hydroxyphenylpyruvate dioxygenase (KIC dioxygenase), which converts α-KIC to HMB.

Chemistry

  acid is a monocarboxylic β-hydroxy acid and natural product with the molecular formula . At room temperature, pure   acid occurs as a transparent, colorless to light yellow liquid which is soluble in water.   acid is a weak acid with a pKa of 4.4. Its refractive index is 1.42.

Chemical structure
  acid is a member of the carboxylic acid family of organic compounds. It is a structural analog of butyric acid with a hydroxyl functional group and a methyl substituent located on its beta carbon. By extension, other structural analogs include  acid and  acid.

Synthesis
A variety of synthetic routes to   acid have been developed. The first reported chemical syntheses approached HMB by oxidation of alkene, vicinal diol, and alcohol precursors:
 in 1877, Russian chemists Michael and Alexander Zaytsev reported the preparation of HMB by oxidation of 2-methylpent-4-en-2-ol with chromic acid (H2CrO4);
 in 1880 and 1889, Schirokoff and Reformatsky (respectively) reported that the oxidative cleavage of the vicinal diol 4-methylpentane-1,2,4-triol with acidified potassium permanganate (KMnO4) yields HMB – this result is closest related to the first synthesis as cold dilute KMnO4 oxidises alkenes to vicinal cis-diols which hot acid KMnO4 further oxidises to carbonyl-containing compounds, and the diol intermediate is not obtained when hot acidic conditions are used for alkene oxidation.  In other words, racemic 4-methylpentane-1,2,4-triol is a derivative of 2-methylpent-4-en-2-ol and β-hydroxy β-methylbutyric acid is a derivative of both; and,
 in 1892, Kondakow reported the preparation of HMB by permanganate oxidation of 3-methylbutane-1,3-diol.

Depending on the experimental conditions, cycloaddition of acetone and ketene produces either  or 4,4-dimethyloxetan-2-one, both of which hydrolyze under basic conditions to yield the conjugate base of HMB. The haloform reaction provides another pathway to HMB involving the exhaustive halogenation of the methyl-ketone region of diacetone alcohol with sodium hypobromite or sodium hypochlorite; Diacetone alcohol is readily available from the aldol condensation of acetone. An organometallic approach to HMB involves the carboxylation of tert-butyl alcohol with carbon monoxide and Fenton's reagent (hydrogen peroxide and ferrous iron). Alternatively, HMB can be prepared through microbial oxidation of  acid by the fungus Galactomyces reessii.

Detection in body fluids

The concentration of naturally produced HMB has been measured in several human body fluids using nuclear magnetic resonance spectroscopy, liquid chromatography–mass spectrometry, and gas chromatography–mass spectrometry methods. In the blood plasma and cerebrospinal fluid (CSF) of healthy adults, the average molar concentration of HMB has been measured at 4.0 micromolar (μM). The average concentration of HMB in the intramuscular fluid of healthy men of ages  has been measured at 7.0 μM. In the urine of healthy individuals of any age, the excreted urinary concentration of HMB has been measured in a range of  micromoles per millimole (μmol/mmol) of creatinine. In the breast milk of healthy lactating women, HMB and  have been measured in ranges of  μg/L and  mg/L. In comparison, HMB has been detected and measured in the milk of healthy cows at a concentration of  μg/L. This concentration is far too low to be an adequate dietary source of HMB for obtaining pharmacologically active concentrations of the compound in blood plasma.

In a study where participants consumed 2.42 grams of pure  while fasting, the average plasma HMB concentration increased from a basal level of 5.1  to 408 μM after 30 minutes. At 150 minutes post-ingestion, the average plasma HMB concentration among participants was 275 μM.

Abnormal HMB concentrations in urine and blood plasma have been noted in several disease states where it may serve as a diagnostic biomarker, particularly in the case of metabolic disorders. The following table lists some of these disorders along with the associated HMB concentrations detected in urine or blood plasma.

History

The first reported chemical synthesis of HMB was published in 1877 by the Russian chemists Michael and Alexander Zaytsev. HMB was isolated from the bark of Erythrophleum couminga (a Madagascan tree) in 1941 by Leopold Ružička. The earliest reported isolation of HMB as a human metabolite was by Tanaka and coworkers in 1968 from a patient with isovaleric acidemia.

Nissen founded a company called Metabolic Technologies, Inc. (MTI) around the time of his discovery, which later acquired six HMB-related patents that the company has used to license the right to manufacture and incorporate HMB into dietary supplements. When it first became available commercially in the late 1990s, HMB was marketed solely as an exercise supplement to help athletes and bodybuilders build muscle. MTI subsequently developed two HMB-containing products, Juven and Revigor, to which Abbott Nutrition obtained the market rights in 2003 and 2008 respectively. Since then, Abbott has marketed Juven as a medical food and the Revigor brand of HMB as an active ingredient in food products for athletes (e.g., certain formulations of Myoplex) and other medical foods (e.g., certain formulations of Ensure).

See also 
 3-Aminoisobutyric acid

Notes

Reference notes

References

External links 

 

Amino acid derivatives
Biomolecules
Bodybuilding supplements
Dietary supplements
Ergogenic aids
Human metabolites
Beta hydroxy acids
Medical food
Proteasome inhibitors
Physiology
Rehabilitation medicine
Muscular disorders